Phoradendron leucarpum is a species of mistletoe in the Viscaceae family which is native to the United States and Mexico. Its common names include American mistletoe,  eastern mistletoe, hairy mistletoe and oak mistletoe. It is native to Mexico and the continental United States. It is hemiparasitic, living in the branches of trees. It has opposite leaves that are leathery and thick.
 Ingesting the berries can cause "stomach and intestinal irritation with diarrhea, lowered blood pressure, and slow pulse".

Culture and tradition
Phoradendron leucarpum is used in North America as a surrogate for the similar European mistletoe Viscum album, in Christmas decoration and associated traditions (such as "kissing under the mistletoe"), as well as in rituals by modern druids.  It is commercially harvested and sold for those purposes.

Phoradendron leucarpum is the state floral emblem for the state of Oklahoma. The state did not have an official flower, leaving mistletoe as the assumed state flower until the Oklahoma Rose was designated as such in 2004.

Ecology
Over 60 species of trees are hosts to P. leucarpum, especially trees in the genera of Acer (maple), Fraxinus (ash), Juglans (walnuts), Nyssa, Platanus (plane trees), Populus (poplars), Quercus (oaks), Salix (willows), and Ulmus (elms).

Wildlife
While the sticky substance covering the fruits is toxic to humans, it is a favorite of some birds.

See also
 Phoradendron villosum (Pacific mistletoe, western mistletoe)

References

leucarpum
Parasitic plants
Flora of the United States
Flora of Mexico
Plants described in 1817
Poisonous plants